The  New York Giants season was the franchise's 21st season in the National Football League.

Schedule

Standings

See also
List of New York Giants seasons

New York Giants seasons
New York Giants
1945 in sports in New York City
1940s in Manhattan
Washington Heights, Manhattan